Anari is a 1975 Hindi-language romance film directed by Asit Sen starring Shashi Kapoor, Sharmila Tagore, Moushumi Chatterjee, Kabir Bedi and Kader Khan.
The music was composed by Laxmikant–Pyarelal.

Plot
Raj (Shashi Kapoor) and Poonam (Sharmila Tagore) are sweethearts cursed with extreme poverty. Raj must provide for his family, and arrange for his sister's marriage. Poonam fights for pennies to nurse her ailing mother, while her father drinks away his earnings. A job offer takes Raj away into a world of wealth and intrigue, but creates a situation where both parties lose their moral compass.

Cast
Shashi Kapoor as Raj
Sharmila Tagore as Poonam 
Moushumi Chatterjee as Rashmi 
Kabir Bedi
Kader Khan
Utpal Dutt
Dina Pathak
Asit Sen as Asit Sen
Birbal

Music
Music composed by Laxmikant–Pyarelal. Lyrics by Majrooh Sultanpuri. Playback singers include Asha Bhosle, Kishore Kumar, Lata Mangeshkar, Mehmood and Mohammed Rafi.

Track List

References

External links
 

1975 films
1970s Hindi-language films
1970s romance films
Films scored by Laxmikant–Pyarelal
Indian romance films
Hindi-language romance films